Rosa nitida, also known as the shining rose due to its glossy leaves (nitidus is Latin for 'shining'), is a perennial  species in the plant genus Rosa in the plant family Rosaceae. It is native to northeastern North America, from Connecticut north to Newfoundland and Quebec. It forms a low, suckering, deciduous shrub, growing up to a metre in height, although often less. Its stems are thin and covered in fine bristles. Its pinnate leaves have 7 to 9 shining leaflets which turn bright red, yellow and purple in the fall. Its small pink flowers appear in summer and are subtly but sweetly scented, smelling like Convallaria ("Lily-of-the-Valley"). They are followed by small, round, red hips.

In the wild it grows in bogs and by the edges of ponds. In the garden it is admired for its good leaf coloration in the fall.

Conservation status in the United States
It is a special concern species and believed extirpated in Connecticut, and endangered in New York.

References

nitida
Plants described in 1809
Flora of North America